Ahn Nae-sang (born December 25, 1964) is a South Korean actor. He began his career on the stage, and in 1994 made his film debut in the Bong Joon-ho short film Baeksekin ("White Man" or "White-collar worker"), followed by Jang Sun-woo's Bad Movie in 1997. He has since starred in numerous films, with supporting roles in Lee Chang-dong's Oasis and Poetry, and a leading role in Hoichori ("Cane"). He also appears in television series, notably Conspiracy in the Court, First Wives' Club, Three Brothers, High Kick: Revenge of the Short Legged, and The Light in Your Eyes.

Filmography

Film

Television series

Web show
Variety show
NSA 수사대 (jTBC, 2013)
Delicious Story (SBS, 2007)

Theater
If I Am with You (너와 함께라면, 2012)
A Midsummer Night's Dream (2009) 
Dandelion Becomes Wind (민들레 바람되어, 2009)
Liar

Awards and nominations

References

External links
 Ahn Nae-sang at Mersenne Entertainment
 
 
 
 Ahn Nae-sa

1964 births 
Living people 
People from Daegu 
South Korean male film actors 
South Korean male television actors 
South Korean male stage actors 
South Korean male web series actors 
21st-century South Korean male actors 
Juksan Ahn clan 
ng Fan Club at Daum